The 1884 Ottawa Hockey Club season was the club's first season of play. The club had formed the previous March and now was playing a season against other clubs. They played in red and black striped sweaters.

Season

The club played in the Montreal Winter Carnival Tournament.

Roster
Thomas D. Green, Thomas Gallagher, F.M.S. (Frank) Jenkins, Jack Kerr, Halder Kirby, Albert Peter Low, Nelson Porter, Ernest Taylor, George Young

References
 
 

Montreal Gazette, Feb. 8, 1884
 

Ottawa Senators (original) seasons
Otta